The year 2021 was the 4th year in the history of the Bare Knuckle Fighting Championship, a bare-knuckle fighting promotion based in Philadelphia. The year consisted of 13 events, including an inaugural Fight Night event alongside nine title fights. The promotion also saw the inception of the new Cruiserweight division and its inaugural title fight at Bare Knuckle Fighting Championship 18.

Background 
2021 season is expected to start with Bare Knuckle Fighting Championship: KnuckleMania. BKFC is available on PPV all over the world and on FITE TV.

Bare Knuckle Fighting Championship 2021 Awards 
The following fighters won the BKFC year-end awards for 2022
BKFC Fighter of the Year 2022: Luis Palomino
BKFC Female Fighter of the Year 2022: Britain Hart
BKFC Fight of the Year 2022: Taylor Starling vs. Charisa Sigala 
BKFC Knockout of the Year 2022: Joe Riggs over Melvin Guillard

List of events

Bare Knuckle Fighting Championship: KnuckleMania

Bare Knuckle Fighting Championship: KnuckleMania was a bare-knuckle fighting event held by Bare Knuckle Fighting Championship on February 5, 2021, in Miami, USA.

Background
Former UFC star Paige VanZant made her bare-knuckle fighting debut in the main event.

Chris Leben made his combat sports retirement appearance against Quentin Henry.

Uly Diaz was initially scheduled to compete on the card, but was eventually removed from the card due to an unknown reason.

Bonus awards

The following fighters were awarded bonuses:
 Fight of the Night: Taylor Starling vs. Charisa Sigala

Results

Bare Knuckle Fighting Championship: Bare Knuckle Kingdom 

Bare Knuckle Fighting Championship: Bare Knuckle Kingdom is a bare-knuckle fighting event by Bare Knuckle Fighting Championship in partnership with Full Metal Dojo held on March 6, 2021, in Thailand.

Background 
In the main event, Steve Banks faced Nikolay Gussev and in the co-main event, Tee Jay Chang and Fabiano Hawthorne will face each other.

Results

Bare Knuckle Fighting Championship 16

Bare Knuckle Fighting Championship 16 was a bare-knuckle fighting event held by Bare Knuckle Fighting Championship on March 19, 2021, in Biloxi, Mississippi, USA.

Background
The event was headlined by Leonard Garcia and Joe Elmore in a lightweight bout.

Former WBO Junior Welterweight World Champion DeMarcus Corley made his bare-knuckle boxing debut at this event against Reggie Barnett Jr.

Results

Bare Knuckle Fighting Championship 17

Bare Knuckle Fighting Championship 17 was a bare-knuckle fighting event by Bare Knuckle Fighting Championship held on April 30, 2021, at the Boutwell Memorial Auditorium in Birmingham, Alabama.

Results

Bare Knuckle Fighting Championship 18

Bare Knuckle Fighting Championship 18 was a bare-knuckle fighting event by Bare Knuckle Fighting Championship held on June 26, 2021, in Miami, Florida.

Results

Bare Knuckle Fighting Championship 19

Bare Knuckle Fighting Championship 19 was a bare-knuckle fighting event by Bare Knuckle Fighting Championship held on July 23, 2021, at the Florida State Fairgrounds Tampa Bay, Florida USA.

Background
The event was headlined by a bare-knuckle boxing rematch Paige VanZant and Rachael Ostovich, who previously fought in mixed martial arts at UFC Fight Night: Cejudo vs. Dillashaw on January 19, 2019.

Also announced for the card, Britain Hart faced Jenny Savage.

Also featured on the card were three "Platform Showdown Fights", amateur bouts between internet celebrities. Rapper Blueface fought TikTok star Kane Trujillo; YouTuber and Musical artist Nick Ireland faced TikToker DK Money; and Tiktoker Evil Hero met fellow Tiktoker Dakota Olave.

Bonus awards

The following fighters were awarded bonuses:
 Fight of the Night: Paige VanZant vs. Rachael Ostovich
 Knockout of the Night: Jared Warren

Results

Bare Knuckle Fighting Championship 20

Bare Knuckle Fighting Championship 20 was a bare-knuckle fighting event by Bare Knuckle Fighting Championship held on August 20, 2021.

Background
The event was headlined by a title rematch for the vacant BKFC Bantamweight Championship between Johnny Bedford and Reggie Barnett. The two previously fought for the title at BKFC 6 on June 22, 2019, where Bedford won by unanimous decision.

Former UFC fighter Alan Belcher made his bare-knuckle debut against Tony Lopez.

Results

Bare Knuckle Fighting Championship 21

Bare Knuckle Fighting Championship 21 was a bare-knuckle fighting event by Bare Knuckle Fighting Championship held on September 10, 2021.

Background
The event was headlined by a bout between Dakota Cochrane and Mike Richman.

The event also featured the BKFC debut of former UFC fighter Houston Alexander.

Results

Bare Knuckle Fighting Championship Fight Night: Montana

Bare Knuckle Fighting Championship Fight Night: Montana was a bare-knuckle fighting event held by Bare Knuckle Fighting Championship held on October 9, 2021.

Background
The event was the inaugural event in the BKFC Fight Night series. It was headlined by a bout between former UFC fighters Melvin Guillard and Joe Riggs.

Results

Bare Knuckle Fighting Championship Fight Night: Wichita

Bare Knuckle Fighting Championship Fight Night: Wichita was a bare-knuckle fighting event held by Bare Knuckle Fighting Championship on October 23, 2021.

Background

Results

Bare Knuckle Fighting Championship Fight Night: New York

Bare Knuckle Fighting Championship Fight Night: New York was a bare-knuckle fighting event held by Bare Knuckle Fighting Championship held on November 6, 2021.

Background
The event was headlined by a rematch between Joey Beltran and Arnold Adams for the BKFC Heavyweight Championship. The pair originally fought in 2018 at BKFC 2: A New Era, with Adams winning via TKO in the fourth round.

Results

Bare Knuckle Fighting Championship 22

Bare Knuckle Fighting Championship 22 was a bare-knuckle fighting event held by Bare Knuckle Fighting Championship on November 12, 2021.

Background
The event was headlined by a title match between the BKFC Cruiserweight Champion Hector Lombard and Lorenzo Hunt for the inaugural BKFC Light Heavyweight Championship.

The co-main event saw Luis Palomino defending the BKFC Lightweight Championship against former BKFC Bantamweight Champion Dat Nguyen.

Results

Bare Knuckle Fighting Championship Fight Night: Tampa

Bare Knuckle Fighting Championship Fight Night: Tampa was a bare-knuckle fighting event by Bare Knuckle Fighting Championship held on December 9, 2021.

Background
The event was headlined by a Lightweight Title Eliminator bout between Martin Brown and Bobby Taylor.

Results

Bare Knuckle Fighting Championship Thailand 1: The Game Changer 

Bare Knuckle Fighting Championship Thailand 1: The Game Changer is an upcoming bare-knuckle fighting event by Bare Knuckle Fighting Championship to be held on December 18, 2021, in Thailand.

Background 
In the main event, Tee Jay Chang and Fabiano Hawthorne and in the co-main event, Sirimongkol Singmanasak and Reza Goodary will face each other. Hawthorne later withdrew due to injury and was replaced by Keivan Soleimani.

Results

See also 
Bare Knuckle Fighting Championship

References

External links
   Bare Knuckle Official Website

Bare Knuckle Fighting Championship
2021 in boxing
2021 sport-related lists